The W81 was a planned American warhead to be mounted on the SM-2 surface-to-air missile used by the United States Navy. The W81 was believed to be derived from the B61 nuclear bomb which forms the backbone of the current US nuclear gravity bomb arsenal and from which the W80 cruise missile warhead is derived. The weapon was being designed at Los Alamos National Laboratory (at the time called Los Alamos Scientific Laboratory).

Design
The W81 went through several design iterations, starting with an enhanced radiation model, then a pure fission model and cancelled in 1986.

Available LASL images show a much shorter weapon, perhaps , probably the final fission-only W81 concept, corresponding with the size of the B61 fission primary alone.

The LASL image clearly shows the warhead taking up most, but not all, of the  SM-2 body diameter.

See also
 List of nuclear weapons
 Standard missile
 B61 nuclear bomb
 B61 Family

References

Nuclear warheads of the United States
Abandoned military projects of the United States